Plainview-Rover School District was a school district headquartered in Plainview, Arkansas, serving Plainview and Rover. Jimmy Cunningham was the last superintendent. The panthers were the mascot.

By 2004 new laws were passed requiring school districts with enrollments below 350 to consolidate with other school districts. Plainview-Rover asked the Arkansas Board of Education if it could consolidate with the Ola School District, which was merging into another district. On July 1, 2004, Plainview-Rover merged with multiple districts into the Two Rivers School District.

References

Further reading
Maps of the Plainview-Rover district:
 Map of Arkansas School Districts pre-July 1, 2004
  (Download)

External links
 

2004 disestablishments in Arkansas
School districts disestablished in 2004
Defunct school districts in Arkansas
Education in Yell County, Arkansas